Whitehouse v. Jordan [1981] 1 All ER 267: The claimant was a baby who suffered severe brain damage after a difficult birth. The defendant, a senior hospital registrar, was supervising delivery in a high-risk pregnancy. After the mother had been in labour for 22 hours, the defendant used forceps to assist the delivery. The Lords found that the doctor's standard of care did not fall below that of a reasonable doctor in the circumstances and so the baby was awarded no compensation.

See also
Negligence

Notes

English tort case law
1981 in case law
House of Lords cases
1981 in British law